Ołobok  is a village in the administrative district of Gmina Osiecznica, within Bolesławiec County, Lower Silesian Voivodeship, in south-western Poland.

Anti-Nazi activist Otto Hampel was born here, later beheaded in Berlin.

Prior to 1945 it was in Germany.

References

Villages in Bolesławiec County